Bellosguardo is a town and comune in the province of Salerno in the Campania region of south-western Italy.   

The name "Bellosguardo" is made up of two italian words: the first is "bello" that means "beautiful, pretty"; the second is "sguardo" meaning "view, landscape" in the italian vernacole of the place. In the past, the town was also called "Belrisguardo".

Geography
Bellosguardo is located in Cilento and is part of its national park. It borders with the municipalities of Aquara, Felitto, Laurino, Ottati, Roscigno and Sant'Angelo a Fasanella.

Main sights

 St. Michael the Archangel's Church
 Forest Macchia
 St. Maria's convent
 Salvo D'Acquisto's square

Cuisine
Typical dishes include:
 Sfogliatella bellosguardese
 Tortanetto
 Cicci ammaritati
 Bucatini ammullicati
 Coniglio 'mbuttunat

See also
Cilentan dialect

References

External links

 Bellosguardo official website

Cities and towns in Campania
Localities of Cilento